Welsford, Nova Scotia  may refer to one of the following places:
Welsford, Kings, Nova Scotia
Welsford, Pictou, Nova Scotia